The 2018 Delaware Fightin' Blue Hens football team represented the University of Delaware as a member of the Colonial Athletic Association (CAA) during the 2018 NCAA Division I FCS football season. Led by second-year head coach Danny Rocco, the Fightin' Blue Hens compiled an overall record of 7–5 with a mark of 5–3 in conference play, placing in a three-way tie for third in the CAA. Delaware received an at-large bid to the NCAA Division I Football Championship playoffs, the Fightin' Blue Hens they lost in the first round to James Madison. The team played home games at Delaware Stadium in Newark, Delaware.

Previous season

The Fightin' Blue Hens finished the 2017 season 7–4, 5–3 in CAA play to finish in a tie for fourth place.

Preseason

CAA Poll
In the CAA preseason poll released on July 24, 2018, the Fightin' Blue Hens were predicted to finish in third place.

Preseason All-CAA Team
The Fightin' Blue Hens had five players selected to the preseason all-CAA team.

Offense

Kani Kane – RB

Charles Scarff – TE

Mario Farinella – OL

Defense

Tony Reeder – LB

Nasir Adderley – S

Award watch lists

Schedule

Coaching staff

Game summaries

Rhode Island

This marks the first time Delaware opens with a conference game since 2007 (49–31 win at William & Mary).

Lafayette

Cornell

at North Dakota State

This marks Delaware's first trip west of the Mississippi River since the 2010 National Championship (a 19–20 loss to Eastern Washington).
This marks Delaware's first game against a MVFC opponent since 2010 (a 26–3 win over South Dakota State).
This marks Delaware's first ever regular season game west of the Mississippi River, and the first regular season game in the Central Time Zone since 1981 (a 38–14 win at Western Kentucky).

at Richmond

Elon

at New Hampshire

Towson

at Albany

at Stony Brook

Villanova

at James Madison–NCAA Division I First Round

Ranking movements

Players drafted into the NFL

References

Delaware
Delaware Fightin' Blue Hens football seasons
Delaware
Delaware Fightin' Blue Hens football